Chaetopappa plomoensis is a North American species of plants in the family Asteraceae. It found only in the State of Coahuila in northern Mexico.

Chaetopappa plomoensis grows on steep limestone slopes and cliffs in the Chihuahuan Desert. It is very similar to the more widespread C. parryi but has leaves that are pubescent on both surfaces, and a distinctive pappus attached to the achenes, long narrow bristles instead of the short scales characteristic of C. parryi.

References

External links
photo of herbarium specimen at Universidad Nacional Autónoma de México, collected in Coahuila, type specimen of Chaetopappa plomoensis

plomoensis
Endemic flora of Mexico
Flora of Coahuila
Flora of the Chihuahuan Desert
Plants described in 1977